Clasmatocolea is a genus of liverworts belonging to the family Lophocoleaceae.

Species

The genus has 28 accepted species:

 Clasmatocolea alpina (Rodway) Grolle
 Clasmatocolea amplectens (Mitt.) J.J.Engel
 Clasmatocolea bisexualis Glenny & J.J.Engel
 Clasmatocolea crassiretis (Herzog) Grolle
 Clasmatocolea ctenophylla (Schiffn.) Grolle
 Clasmatocolea cucullistipula (Steph.) Grolle
 Clasmatocolea exigua Stephani
 Clasmatocolea fasciculata (Nees) Grolle
 Clasmatocolea fragillima Spruce
 Clasmatocolea fulvella (Hook.f. & Taylor) Grolle
 Clasmatocolea gayana (Mont.) Grolle
 Clasmatocolea heterostipa Spruce
 Clasmatocolea humilis (Hook.f. & Taylor) Grolle
 Clasmatocolea inflexispina (Hook.f. & Taylor) J.J.Engel
 Clasmatocolea innovata Herzog
 Clasmatocolea marginata (Steph.) Grolle
 Clasmatocolea minutiretis J.J.Engel & Grolle
 Clasmatocolea moniliformis J.J.Engel
 Clasmatocolea navistipula (Steph.) Grolle
 Clasmatocolea notophylla (Hook.f. & Taylor) Grolle
 Clasmatocolea obvoluta (Hook.f. & Taylor) Grolle
 Clasmatocolea puccioana (De Not.) Grolle
 Clasmatocolea rigens (Hook.f. & Taylor) J.J.Engel
 Clasmatocolea strongylophylla (Hook.f. & Taylor) Grolle
 Clasmatocolea trachyopa (Hook.f. & Taylor) Grolle
 Clasmatocolea trachypus (Hook.f. & Taylor) Grolle
 Clasmatocolea vermicularis (Lehm.) Grolle
 Clasmatocolea verrucosa J.J.Engel

References

Jungermanniales
Jungermanniales genera